Space Technology 5 (ST5) of the NASA New Millennium program was a test of ten new technologies aboard a group of microsatellites. Developed by NASA Goddard Space Flight Center, the three individual small spacecraft were launched together from the belly of a Lockheed L-1011 aboard the Pegasus XL rocket, on 22 March 2006.  One technology involved antennas that were designed by computers using an evolutionary AI system developed at NASA Ames Research Center.  The ST5 on-board flight computer, the C&DH (Command & Data Handling) system, was based on a Mongoose-V radiation-hardened microprocessor.

On 30 June 2006 the satellites making up ST5 were shut down after successfully completing their technology validation mission.

Mission objectives
ST5's objective was to demonstrate and flight qualify several innovative technologies and concepts for application to future space missions.

 Communications Components for Small Spacecraft The X-Band Transponder Communications System was provided by AeroAstro. The transponder system is a miniaturized digital communications transponder. It provides coherent uplink-to-downlink operation that provides a ground-to-space command capability, space-to-ground telemetry capability, and a radio frequency tracking capability. The X-Band weighs approximately 1/12 as much and is 1/9 the volume of communications systems now used in other missions.

 Evolved antenna A supercomputer using an artificial evolution algorithm designed a very tiny, highly unlikely looking, but highly promising communication antenna for the ST5 spacecraft.  The radiator was designed by NASA Ames and the antenna itself was implemented by the Physical Science Laboratory at New Mexico State University.  (As a note, each spacecraft has two X-band antennas: an evolved (the solid black painted unit) and a quadrifilar helix antenna (the two-toned, black and white unit).  The quadrifilar helix antennas were also developed at the NMSU Physical Science Laboratory.)

 Lithium-Ion Power System for Small Satellites The Low-Voltage Power System uses a low-weight Li-Ion battery that can store up to four times as much energy as a Ni-Cad battery, charged by triple junction solar cells. The Li-Ion rechargeable battery has a longer life and exhibits no memory effect.

 Ultra Low-Power Demonstration The CULPRiT is a new type of microelectronic device that allows circuits to operate at 0.5 Volts. The technology will greatly reduce power consumption while achieving a radiation tolerance of ~100 kRad total dose and latch-up immunity.

 Variable Emittance Coatings for Thermal Control The Variable Emittance Coatings, provided by Sensortex, Inc. and the Applied Physics Laboratory (APL), are used for thermal control and consist of an electrically tunable coating that can change properties, from absorbing heat when cool to reflecting or emitting heat when in the Sun. The Microelectromechanical System (MEMS) chip is part of this technology.

 Propulsion Systems Components A miniature microthruster that provides fine attitude adjustments on the spacecraft. The Cold Gas Microthruster (CGMT) is a tiny electromechanical system designed by Marotta Scientific Controls, Inc. to provide fine attitude adjustments on each of the micro-sats. It uses 1/8 the power and weighs only half as much as attitude control systems being used in other missions.

 Miniature magnetometer
 Miniature spinning sun sensor
 Spacecraft deployment mechanism
 Magnetometer deployment boom
 Nutation dampe

See also

 List of spaceflights (2006)

References

External links
 Space Technology 5 JPL NMP page
 Space Technology 5 NASA page

Earth observation satellites of the United States
New Millennium Program
NASA satellites
Spacecraft launched in 2006
Spacecraft launched by Pegasus rockets